Friedrichshain-Kreuzberg is the second borough of Berlin, formed in 2001 by merging the former East Berlin borough of Friedrichshain and the former West Berlin borough of Kreuzberg. The historic Oberbaum Bridge, formerly a Berlin border crossing for pedestrians, links both districts across the river Spree as the new borough's landmark (as featured in the coat of arms).

The counterculture tradition especially of Kreuzberg has led to the borough being a stronghold for the Green Party. While Kreuzberg is characterised by a high number of immigrants, the share of non-German citizens in Friedrichshain is much lower and the average age is higher. The merger between the distinct quarters is celebrated by an annual anarchic "vegetable fight" on the Oberbaumbrücke. Both parts have to deal with the consequences of gentrification.

History
The Berlin district of Kreuzberg-Friedrichshain has a rich and complex history that reflects the city's changing political and cultural landscape over the past two centuries.

Located in the heart of the city, Kreuzberg and Friedrichshain were once separate neighborhoods that were united into a single district in 2001. The area is known for its diverse and vibrant cultural scene, as well as its history as a center of political activism and counterculture.

Kreuzberg has a long history as a working-class neighborhood and was heavily damaged during World War II. After the war, the area became home to many immigrants, including Turkish and other migrants from the Middle East and Europe. In the 1970s and 1980s, Kreuzberg became a center of political activism and alternative culture, with a large youth and student population.
Friedrichshain, on the other hand, has a more diverse history. It was originally a working-class neighborhood, but was heavily bombed during World War II and then divided by the Berlin Wall after the war. After the fall of the Wall in 1989, Friedrichshain underwent a process of gentrification and became a popular neighborhood for artists, students, and young professionals.
In recent years, both Kreuzberg and Friedrichshain have become popular tourist destinations, known for their lively streets, diverse cultural scene, and rich history.

Subdivision
Friedrichshain-Kreuzberg is divided into 2 localities, Friedrichshain and Kreuzberg.

Politics

District council
The governing body of Friedrichshain-Kreuzberg is the district council (Bezirksverordnetenversammlung). It has responsibility for passing laws and electing the city government, including the mayor. The most recent district council election was held on 26 September 2021, and the results were as follows: 

! colspan=2| Party
! Lead candidate
! Votes
! %
! +/-
! Seats
! +/-
|-
| bgcolor=| 
| align=left| Alliance 90/The Greens (Grüne)
| align=left| Clara Hermmann
| 48,254
| 34.6
|  1.9
| 22
|  2
|-
| bgcolor=| 
| align=left| The Left (LINKE)
| align=left| Oliver Nöll
| 30,124
| 21.6
|  0.8
| 13
|  1
|-
| bgcolor=| 
| align=left| Social Democratic Party (SPD)
| align=left| Andy Hehmke
| 20,554
| 14.8
|  2.5
| 9
|  1
|-
| bgcolor=| 
| align=left| Christian Democratic Union (CDU)
| align=left| Timur Husein
| 10,898
| 7.8
|  0.1
| 5
|  1
|-
| bgcolor=| 
| align=left| Free Democratic Party (FDP)
| align=left| Marlene Heihsel
| 6,561
| 4.7
|  1.5
| 3
|  1
|-
| bgcolor=| 
| align=left| Die PARTEI
| align=left| Riza Cörtlen
| 5,214
| 3.7
|  0.9
| 2
| ±0
|-
| bgcolor=| 
| align=left| Alternative for Germany (AfD)
| align=left| Frank Scheermesser
| 4,333
| 3.1
|  3.1
| 1
|  2
|-
| colspan=8 bgcolor=lightgrey|
|-
| bgcolor=| 
| align=left| Tierschutzpartei
| align=left| 
| 3,185
| 2.3
| New
| 0
| New
|-
| bgcolor=| 
| align=left| Volt Germany
| align=left| 
| 2,922
| 2.1
| New
| 0
| New
|-
| bgcolor=| 
| align=left| Klimaliste
| align=left| 
| 2,329
| 1.7
| New
| 0
| New
|-
| bgcolor=| 
| align=left| dieBasis
| align=left| 
| 2,267
| 1.6
| New
| 0
| New
|-
| bgcolor=| 
| align=left| Bergpartei
| align=left| 
| 989
| 0.7
| New
| 0
| New
|-
| bgcolor=| 
| align=left| The Humanists
| align=left| 
| 528
| 0.4
| New
| 0
| New
|-
| 
| align=left| We are Berlin
| align=left| 
| 506
| 0.4
| New
| 0
| New
|-
| 
| align=left| Open List Friedrichshain
| align=left| 
| 321
| 0.2
| New
| 0
| New
|-
| bgcolor=| 
| align=left| Ecological Democratic Party
| align=left| 
| 285
| 0.2
|  0.2
| 0
| ±0
|-
! colspan=3| Valid votes
! 139,270
! 99.3
! 
! 
! 
|-
! colspan=3| Invalid votes
! 951
! 0.7
! 
! 
! 
|-
! colspan=3| Total
! 140,221
! 100.0
! 
! 55
! ±0
|-
! colspan=3| Electorate/voter turnout
! 198,561
! 70.6
!  8.5
! 
! 
|-
| colspan=8| Source: Elections Berlin
|}

District government
The district mayor (Bezirksbürgermeister) is elected by the Bezirksverordnetenversammlung, and positions in the district government (Bezirksamt) are apportioned based on party strength. Clara Herrmann of the Greens was elected mayor on 6 December 2021. Since the 2021 municipal elections, the composition of the district government is as follows:

Twin towns – sister cities

Friedrichshain-Kreuzberg is twinned with:

 Al-Malikiyah, Syria (2017)
 Bergstraße (district), Germany (1969)
 Ingelheim am Rhein, Germany (1971)
 Kadıköy (Istanbul), Turkey (1996)
 Kiryat Yam, Israel (1990)
 Limburg-Weilburg, Germany (1980)
 Oborishte (Sofia), Bulgaria (1999)
 Porta Westfalica, Germany (1968)
 San Rafael del Sur, Nicaragua (1986)
 Szczecin, Poland (1996)
 Wiesbaden, Germany (1964)

See also

Berlin-Friedrichshain-Kreuzberg – Prenzlauer Berg East

References

External links

Official homepage 
Official homepage of Berlin 

 
Districts of Berlin